Hal E. Broxmeyer (1943/1944 – 8 December 2021) was an American microbiologist. He was a professor at the Mary Margaret Walther Program for Cancer Care Research, and Professor of Microbiology and Immunology at the Indiana University School of Medicine. He received a BS degree from City University of New York, and PhD from New York University.

Life and career
Broxmeyer was internationally recognized for his work on human umbilical cord blood as a source of transplantable hematopoietic stem cells. In 1988, he first coordinated a study in successfully demonstrating clinical utility of cord blood transplantation to cure a hematological disorder of a child (Fanconi anemia) working together with Dra. Gluckman. This intervention took place in Hospital Saint-Louis (Paris) and was successful.  Work from his laboratory established the field of clinical cord blood transplantation.     

He died from thyroid cancer on 8 December 2021, at the age of 77.

Awards and honors
 Dirk van Bekkum Award (2002)
 E. Donnall Thomas Prize and Lecture (2006)
 President, American Society of Hematology (2010)
 Elected Fellow of American Association for Advancement of Science (2012)

References

1940s births
2021 deaths

Year of birth uncertain

American microbiologists

Fellows of the American Association for the Advancement of Science
Indiana University faculty
City University of New York alumni
New York University alumni
Presidents of the American Society of Hematology